The Haledon School District is a community public school district that serves students in pre-kindergarten through eighth grade from Haledon, in Passaic County, New Jersey, United States.

As of the 2021–22 school year, the district, comprised of one school, had an enrollment of 1,020 students and 96.0 classroom teachers (on an FTE basis), for a student–teacher ratio of 10.6:1.

The district is classified by the New Jersey Department of Education as being in District Factor Group "B", the second-lowest of eight groupings. District Factor Groups organize districts statewide to allow comparison by common socioeconomic characteristics of the local districts. From lowest socioeconomic status to highest, the categories are A, B, CD, DE, FG, GH, I and J.

For ninth through twelfth grades, public school students attend Manchester Regional High School, located in Haledon, which also serves students from North Haledon, and Prospect Park. The Manchester district participates in the Interdistrict Public School Choice Program, which allows non-resident students to attend the district's schools without cost to their parents, with tuition paid by the state. Available slots are announced annually by grade. As of the 2021–22 school year, the high school had an enrollment of 748 students and 65.5 classroom teachers (on an FTE basis), for a student–teacher ratio of 11.4:1.

School
Schools in the district are:
Haledon Public School, which had an enrollment of 1,048 students in the 2021–22 school year.
Christopher Wacha, Principal

Administration
Core members of the district's administration are:
Christopher Wacha, Superintendent. Hernandez serves as a joint superintendent with the Manchester Regional High School District.
Lameka Augustin, Business Administrator / Board Secretary

Board of education
The district's board of education, comprised of nine members, sets policy and oversees the fiscal and educational operation of the district through its administration. As a Type II school district, the board's trustees are elected directly by voters to serve three-year terms of office on a staggered basis, with three seats up for election each year held (since 2013) as part of the November general election. The board appoints a superintendent to oversee the district's day-to-day operations and a business administrator to supervise the business functions of the district.

References

External links
Haledon Public School

School Data for the Haledon Public School, National Center for Education Statistics
Manchester Regional High School

Haledon, New Jersey
New Jersey District Factor Group B
School districts in Passaic County, New Jersey